Goldborough Farm Meadows is a 10.32 hectare biological Site of Special Scientific Interest in Wiltshire, England.

Sources

 Natural England citation sheet for the site (accessed 1 April 2022)

External links
 Natural England website (SSSI information)

Sites of Special Scientific Interest in Wiltshire
Meadows in Wiltshire